Armenia Gardens Estates is a neighborhood within the city limits of Tampa, Florida. As of the 2010 census the neighborhood had a population of 2,980. The ZIP Codes serving the neighborhood are 33604 and 33614.

Geography
Armenia Gardens Estates boundaries are Sligh Avenue to the south, Waters Avenue to the north, Rome Avenue to the east, and the unincorporated community of Egypt Lake to the west.

Demographics
Source: Hillsborough County Atlas

At the 2010 census there were 2,980 people and 1,110 households residing in the neighborhood. The population density was 4,750/mi2. The racial makeup of the neighborhood was 77% White, 9% African American, 0% Native American, 3% Asian, 7% from other races and 3% from two or more races. Hispanic or Latino of any race were 49%.

Of the 1,110 households 27% had children under the age of 18 living with them, 42% were married couples living together, 16% had a female householder with no husband present, and 8% were non-families. 27% of households were made up of individuals.

The age distribution was 22% under the age of 18, 20% from 18 to 34, 22% from 35 to 49, 20% from 50 to 64, and 17% 65 or older. For every 100 females, there were 102.6 males.

The per capita income for the neighborhood was $15,869. About  13% of the population were below the poverty line, 22% of those were under the age of 18.

See also
Neighborhoods in Tampa, Florida
List of places named after Armenia

References

External links
Armenia Gardens Estates Civic Association

Neighborhoods in Tampa, Florida